The Vosper 73 foot Motor Torpedo Boat was a mid-twentieth century British motor torpedo boat (MTB) designed by Vospers that served in the Royal Navy Coastal Forces during the Second World War.

Development
The design came about from a requirement that British motor torpedo boats should be better able to fight other small craft, which was the job of motor gun boats (MGB). To this end Vospers built on their existing 70 foot designs, and the design was trialled with MTB 379. Sixteen (MTB 380-345) were ordered in 1943. A second contract for five more (MTB 523-527) with heavier gun armament was placed in December. 

The boats carried four 18-inch torpedo tubes as their major offensive armament along with Oerlikon 20 mm cannon and some defensive armament (two twin Vickers K machine guns, one either side) for protection against enemy aircraft. The type II gave up two torpedo tubes, but gained a QF 6 pounder gun which displaced the Oerlikon to the aft deck. This made it more capable of performing the MGB role.

Service
The first of the type Is entered service in 1944 but the type II wasn't introduced before the end of the Second World War. 
Of the 29 built to this design none survives, although a slightly earlier model 60 ft example has been saved and resides at the Imperial War Museum Duxford.
MTB382 was sold (minus the three Packard engines) in 1947 and converted into a houseboat, berthed on the Chelmer & Blackwater canal at Heybridge Basin, Essex. She was renamed 'M.Y. Vixen' and remained in use as such until late 1953. She laid empty in the canal through the 1953 east-coast storm and tide-surge which broke the banks of the canal, but left the flat planing-hull quite unaffected. All attempts to sell the boat thereafter failed, so she was subsequently broken up for scrap over the next year or so on the mud-flats of the River Blackwater outside the Heybridge Basin sea-lock.

Notes

References

External links
 

 

Boat types
Motor torpedo boats of the Royal Navy